The 1974 Arkansas International was a men's tennis tournament played on hard courts at Burns Park in North Little Rock, Arkansas in the United States that was part of the 1974 USLTA Indoor Circuit. It was the inaugural edition of the event and was held from February 4 through February 10, 1974. First-seeded Jimmy Connors won the singles title and earned $4,000 first-prize money.

Finals

Singles
 Jimmy Connors defeated  Karl Meiler 6–2, 6–1
 It was Connors' 3rd singles title of the year and the 20th of his career.

Doubles
 Jürgen Fassbender /  Karl Meiler defeated  Vitas Gerulaitis /  Bob Hewitt 6–0, 6–2

References

External links
 ITF tournament edition details

Arkansas International
Arkansas International
Arkansas International